Marou may refer to:

 Busby Marou, an Australian musical duo
 Marou Amadou, Nigerian politician
 Marou, a character from the 1985 manga Blood Reign: Curse of the Yoma

See also 
 Andre Marrou (born 1938), American politician